James Harvey Hylton (August 26, 1934 – April 28, 2018) was an American stock car racing driver. He was a two-time winner in NASCAR Winston Cup Series competition and was a long-time competitor in the ARCA Racing Series. Hylton finished second in points in NASCAR's top series three times. He holds the record for highest points finish by a rookie.

Although Hylton had only two wins at the Cup level, he collected 140 top 5s and 301 top 10s in 601 races. Hylton was in the championship hunt several times in the 1960s and 1970s, finishing second in points in 1966, 1967, and 1971. Hylton also holds the record as the oldest driver to finish a race in NASCAR's top 3 series when he raced at Daytona in the Xfinity Series (then the Nationwide Series), in 2008 at the age of 73.

Early life
Hylton was born on August 26, 1934 to a Roanoke, Virginia family farm; he was one of thirteen children. Hylton's early years centered primarily around farming but he soon found himself immersed in the world of stock car auto racing.

Auto racing career
Hylton's career in auto racing began in the late 1950s when he began working as a mechanic for Rex White. Hylton, White and Louis Clements teamed to win 26 races and most importantly the 1960 NASCAR Grand National championship. In 1964, White scaled back his driving duties and Hylton began a tenure as crew chief for the Ned Jarrett / Bondy Long team. During the 1964 season the team won 14 races and finished second in points. In 1965, the team won 12 races and won the NASCAR Grand National championship.

On July 8, 1964, Hylton made his first Grand National start at the Old Dominion 400 at Old Dominion Speedway at Manassas, Virginia. He finished 19th and collected $100 for his efforts. Things improved dramatically in 1966, as Hylton finished second in the points chase and won the series' Rookie of the Year award. Hylton also captured his first pole at Starlite Speedway in Monroe, North Carolina. Hylton again finished second in points during the 1967 season while driving Dodges for owner Bud Hartje. Hylton was a model of consistency during this two-year period as he had 46 top five finishes in 87 races, finishing 2nd to Richard Petty in the 1967 standings despite having no wins compared to Petty's 27.

Hylton won the NASCAR Winston Cup Rookie of the Year honors in 1966, and finished second in the season points standings, 1,950 points behind David Pearson. He won only two races over his career. Although, he only won two races, he was always in the thick of the championship hunt. He finished in the Top 10 in the season points standings in ten of the twelve years between 1966 and 1977.

In the 1972 Talladega 500, Hylton won under interesting circumstances, when Goodyear supplied teams with a special tire for superspeedways. However, this tire design proved to shred after long distances under superspeedway conditions.  Because Hylton's team could not afford the new tires they ran with the old ones. Hylton and Ramo Stott, another low tier driver who also could not afford the tires, skated around the other cars, and Hylton won it by less than a second.

Dual role
In 1968, Hylton became a car owner/driver, a dual role that continued until his death. He found his way to victory lane for the first time on March 1, 1970 at the Richmond 500, driving the familiar number 48 Ford. During the late sixties and early seventies, Hylton amassed an amazing consistency record that was rivaled only by those of Richard Petty and Cale Yarborough.

On August 6, 1972, Hylton forever etched his name in the history books by claiming the Talladega 500. Hylton led 106 laps of the 188 lap race and won $24,865 for the day. Hylton won by one car length over ARCA legend Ramo Stott.

Hylton continued driving the full schedule until 1982, when he handed over driving duties to Canadian driver Trevor Boys. He soldiered on as an owner in NASCAR Winston Cup until 1993.

ARCA circuit

Hylton moved to the ARCA Racing Series during the 1990s, and ran in 16 of 23 ARCA REMAX Series schedule in 2006. He finished 18th in the final points standings. Hylton's final planned race was at the inaugural race at Iowa Speedway, but he returned to compete in it more later.

Comeback
Hylton's attempt at a comeback began in 2004, when he attempted to qualify for two races in the Craftsman Truck Series, with Welz Racing and Ron Rhodes Racing, respectively.

On June 24, 2006, Hylton started his first Busch Series race since June 27, 1982 at the AT&T 250 held at the Milwaukee Mile. This made him the oldest driver to start in a 'top level' NASCAR event.

Hylton attempted to make the 2007 Daytona 500 in equipment leased from Richard Childress Racing, sponsored by GrahamFest and Retirement Living TV. Hylton said "I am doing this for seniors to show that at 70 years old, you don't have to go hunting for an old-folks home. You can go race for a little bit."

In the final practice session for the 2007 Daytona 500 he posted the 15th fastest time of 48.532 sec./185.445 m.p.h. He was in a position to qualify for the Daytona 500 with 10 laps remaining in the qualifier when he was leading, then a caution for a wreck was called and on the restart he fell out of the draft due to a clutch problem. He did not qualify for the race. It was announced that he was going to attempt several others races in 2007, including the UAW-Ford 500, but these plans did not come to fruition.

At the age of 74 Hylton returned to Daytona to attempt to qualify for the 2009 Daytona 500. Hylton signed on with E&M Motorsports for the race. Sadly, carburetor issues plagued the team in both Saturday pre-qualifying practice sessions, and Hylton was unable to make a lap. Because NASCAR has a rule that you must make one timed lap in practice to be eligible for qualifying, Hylton and team were forced to withdraw.

Hylton was planning on qualifying his No. 48 car sponsored by the Sons of Confederate Veterans for the ARCA race at Rockingham on April 19, 2009. Hylton lost that sponsorship on April 16, 2009, due to ARCA placing a ban on the organization's logo from being used, as it contains a version of the Confederate Battle Flag. Since this ban breached the contract already entered into by ARCA and the SCV, the SCV cancelled its sponsorship and participation with the race. ARCA was forced to refund the organization's fees due to the breach of contract. Hylton later became a member of the SCV.

Hylton planned to attempt to qualify for the 2010 Daytona 500, but no deal came to fruition. In 2011, Hylton set a record at the 2011 Royal Purple 200 in Darlington as the oldest driver in history to start a NASCAR race in the top three divisions at age 76. At the start of the 2013 season, Hylton announced that the 2013 ARCA season would be his last; in his final start in racing at Kansas Speedway in October, contributions from his fellow ARCA racing teams resulted in his being able to drive a brand-new car and engine combination, finishing 18th in his final race.

Post-retirement team ownership

Hylton stated that his plans following his retirement included continued participation in the ARCA Racing Series as a team owner, planning to hire a younger driver to run the No. 48. Sean Corr ran the car in 2014 along with several other drivers. Corr returned to Daytona in 2015. Brad Smith took over as driver planning the full season, but an injury at Talladega forced him out of the car; James Swanson took over the ride as the team switched to Dodge.

Death
On April 28, 2018, Hylton, his son James "Tweet" Hylton Jr., and the team's crew chief Terry Strange were driving home from the ARCA race at Talladega, and the team's hauler was in a traffic accident going northbound on Interstate 85 near Carnesville, Georgia. Both Hyltons died in the accident, while Strange survived with severe injuries. It was unclear how the accident occurred. There were several conflicting reports once Strange was questioned. One statement claimed that Hylton Sr. was having a heart attack, and when checking, he lost control. Another statement said that Strange lost control and neither Hylton was wearing a seatbelt. Strange's statement said that while driving a car veered into his lane, causing him to hit a dirt embankment and then crash into the highway median.

Motorsports career results

NASCAR
(key) (Bold – Pole position awarded by qualifying time. Italics – Pole position earned by points standings or practice time. * – Most laps led.)

Grand National Series

Winston Cup Series

Daytona 500

Nationwide Series

Camping World Truck Series

 Season still in progress
 Ineligible for series points

ARCA Racing Series
(key) (Bold – Pole position awarded by qualifying time. Italics – Pole position earned by points standings or practice time. * – Most laps led.)

References

External links

 
 
 
James Hylton on Decades of Racing

1934 births
2018 deaths
Sportspeople from Roanoke, Virginia
Racing drivers from Virginia
NASCAR drivers
ARCA Menards Series drivers
NASCAR team owners
Road incident deaths in Georgia (U.S. state)